Halifax Parish was created as a civil parish in Prince County, Prince Edward Island, Canada, during the 1764–1766 survey of Samuel Holland.

It contains the following townships:

 Lot 8
 Lot 9
 Lot 10
 Lot 11
 Lot 12

Parishes of Prince Edward Island
Geography of Prince County, Prince Edward Island